Go Fighting! is a Chinese variety show broadcast on SMG: Dragon Television. It was first aired on 14 June 2015. Go Fighting! is classified as a game-variety-reality show, and the MCs and guests complete missions at a landmark to win the objective. Usually each episode will also have an overarching theme or story. Each episode varies in the challenges and the instructions given to the MCs, and rules are not strictly enforced, resulting in a largely unscripted show.

, 26 episodes of Go Fighting!, including 1 special episode and a movie, have been aired.

Series overview

List of Episodes

First Season

Second Season

Third Season

Fourth Season

Fifth Season

Sixth Season

Notes

References

External links
Go Fighting! Official Weibo

Go Fighting!